The Electoral district of Richmond was a single-member electoral district of the Tasmanian House of Assembly. Its capital was the town of Richmond to the north of Hobart.

The seat was created ahead of the Assembly's first election held in 1856, and was abolished at the 1903 election. Its first member, Thomas Gregson, served as the second Premier of Tasmania for a few weeks in 1857.

Members for Richmond

References
 
 
 Parliament of Tasmania (2006). The Parliament of Tasmania from 1956

Richmond